The Sovereign Military Order of Malta has had Permanent Observer status at the United Nations General Assembly in New York City since 1994. It has also had an observer present at the UN offices in Vienna since 2009. This is a list of individuals who have been the UN Permanent Observer for the Order.

See also
List of current Permanent Representatives to the United Nations

Notes

External links
Permanent Observer Mission of the Sovereign Military Order of Malta to the United Nations, IAEA and CTBTO in Vienna official website
Permanent Observer Mission of the Sovereign Military Order of Malta to the United Nations in New York official website

Malta